Nevada Union High School (NU) is located in the Sierra Nevada foothills northeast of California's capital, Sacramento. Situated between Nevada City and Grass Valley, the school serves those two incorporated cities and a large surrounding community. The Nevada Union High School district covers a huge geographic area, with some students bussed in from as far as 56 miles away. NU was named a California Distinguished School in 1997 and 2012, and in 1998 was recognized as a National Blue Ribbon High School. NUHS serves ninth through twelfth grade students. NUHS does not have an ethnically diverse student population, as 99% are Caucasian. It is, however, economically diverse, with 45% of families qualifying for the Free and Reduced National School Lunch Program.

History
Nevada Union opened in 1961 to serve the needs of Nevada City, Grass Valley, and the surrounding communities.  Prior to 1961, the high school was located in Grass Valley.

In the 2005-2006 school year, 242 of 602 seniors (40%) took the SAT, with average scores of 554 in Critical Reading (~65th percentile), 559 in Math (~63rd percentile), and 548 in Writing (~68th percentile).

Nevada Union HS campus was opened at its current location in 1961 as a Senior High School (Grades 10-12).  This was not the first campus for NUHS.  When the District was formed in 1952, the Senior High School opened at the previous Grass Valley High School and the Junior High School (Grades 7-9)* was initially opened at the former Nevada City High School.  With the opening of the new campus in 1961, the Junior High School was moved to the campus of the previous Senior High School.
After a few years, students at the main feeder grammar schools (Nevada City Elementary and Hennesey Elementary in Grass Valley) had the choice of remaining at their respective schools for Grades 7-8 or transferring to the Junior High School.

Student body
Students who attend Nevada Union are not only from Grass Valley and Nevada City; they also commute from North San Juan, Penn Valley, Rough and Ready, Cedar Ridge, Chicago Park, Lake Wildwood, Oregon House, Brownsville, and Alta Sierra. 
 Many find the bus routes to be insufficient for these areas.

Athletics
The NU mascot is the Miner, with female teams referred to as the "Lady Miners".  The school colors are officially blue and gold, and the shades of those two colors have changed over time.

Due to NU's relative success in several athletic programs, it has developed some significant rivalries that have changed over the years due to league realignments and changes in sports programs.  A big rival in the 70s was Placer High School in nearby Auburn. In the 80s and 90s, Grant High School in Sacramento was considered the chief rival.  Grant High School has recently become a season game once again due to league changes, and were throttled by the Nevada Union miners in 2012.

In both 2004 and 2005 the Lady Miners volleyball team appeared twice at the Division I California State Championships to compete for the state title.

In 2005 the Nevada Union football team won the first section title in more than a decade, placing first in the state of California and 19th in the United States. The final game was Nevada Union 46, West 7.

In 2008, the Lady Miners volleyball team won its seventh straight section title.  This set a new record in all of California for most consecutive section titles in any sport.

In 2009, Nevada Union's Miner Football team won its second section title in ten years.

NU offers cross country, track, swimming, soccer, tennis, golf, Nordic skiing, snowboarding, alpine skiing, dance, wrestling, and a mountain bike team.

Football is the main target of Nevada Union's booster support.

Performing arts
Throughout the past decade, Nevada Union has thoroughly established itself as a producer of performing artists, and Nevada Union's drama department has produced several notable young actors of the new age. The drama department, the Nevada Union Theatrical Society or NUTS, has produced several outstanding plays in the last several years.

The Nevada Union Instrumental Music program is a multi-faceted, award-winning program. The band consists of roughly 150 members, many of whom belong to multiple bands. The concert/symphonic band has taken many awards and received several unanimous "superior" ratings in the past three years. This band is much more extensive, with several members already playing for professional orchestras.

Nevada Union also has two small jazz bands and a marching band. The marching band has received nearly fifty awards altogether, and has also had an award-winning color guard and percussion division during the winter. The marching band follows the Drum Corps International style of marching band, and has one drum major.

The Nevada Union High School Choir Program has seven outstanding choirs. This program consists of roughly 250 members. The Concert and Chamber Choirs place in the top five every year at Golden State Festival in Northern California. Every other year, these choirs travel to Europe to perform, always receiving high amounts of praise. The Chamber Choir is favored in the community, and performs at many events throughout the year. This choir program has been award-winning for over fifty years, first under director Don Baggett and now with his son, director Rod Baggett.

Notable alumni
Greg F. Anderson, former personal trainer for Barry Bonds
Rich Brooks, football coach
Hunter Burgan, musician
Alela Diane, musician
Noah Georgeson, musician and record producer
Spencer Havner, football player
Zach Helm, writer and director
Joanna Newsom, musician
Rick Rossovich, actor
Gabe Ruediger, retired mixed martial arts fighter
Chris Senn, professional skateboarder
Tanner Vallejo, NFL linebacker for the Arizona Cardinals

References 

Public high schools in California
High schools in Nevada County, California
1961 establishments in California
Educational institutions established in 1961